Hellboy: Weird Tales is a Dark Horse Comics bimonthly eight-issue comic book limited series that offered a variety of guest writers and artists the chance to give their own take on the Hellboy characters created by Mike Mignola whilst he was in Prague working on the first Hellboy movie. The issues were published bi-monthly to alternate with a series of B.P.R.D. one-shots and were collected in two trade paperback volumes.

Issues

Issue #1
Published February 26, 2003. Cover by John Cassaday.

Issue #2
Published April 23, 2003. Cover by Jason Pearson.

Issue #3
Published June 25, 2003. Cover by Alex Maleev.

Issue #4
Published August 27, 2003. Cover by Leinil Francis Yu.

Issue #5
Published October 15, 2003. Cover by J.H. Williams III.

Issue #6
Published December 10, 2003, Cover by Frank Cho.

Issue #7
Published February 11, 2004 cover by Phil Noto.

Issue #8
Published April 14, 2004 cover by Michael William Kaluta.

Collected editions
The series has been collected into two trade paperbacks and one hardcover edition:

Volume 1 (collects Hellboy: Weird Tales #1-4, February 2003)
Volume 2 (collects Hellboy: Weird Tales #5-8, October 2004)
HC - Hardcover (collects Hellboy: Weird Tales #1-8 (Volume 1 & 2) and the "How Koshchei Became Deathless" and "Baba Yaga's Feast" back-ups from Hellboy: The Wild Hunt #2-4, December 2014)

Awards

The character Hellboy in Hellboy: Weird Tales was nominated for the 2003 "Favourite Hero" Wizard Fan Award.
John Cassady won the 2004 "Best Artist/Penciller/Inker" Eisner Award in part for his work on this title.

Notes

References

2003 comics debuts
2004 comics endings
Fantasy comics